The Saracens Sports Club (Saracens SC) is a Sri Lankan first-class cricket team that competes in the Premier Trophy.

Honours
 Premier Trophy (1) 
2008–09 (Tier B)

Current squad
Players with international caps are listed in bold

References

External links
 Saracens Sports Club at CricketArchive

Sri Lankan first-class cricket teams